Dastgāh-e Chahārgāh  is a musical modal system in traditional mugham music and one of the seven Dastgāhs of Persian Music. Classically, Persian Music is organized into seven Dastgāhs and five Āvāzes, however from a merely technical point of view, one can consider them as an ensemble of 12 Dastgāhs.

This is the fifth and the longest mode according to the amount of sounds. It consists of eleven membranes. Three tetra-chords are amalgamated with two methods. The first and the second tetra-chords are amalgamated with the first method. The second and the third tetra-chords are amalgamated with different method. Tetra-chords are 0.5+1.5+0.5 tone structural. Chahargah mode is represented in two kinds in Uzeyir Hajibeyov’s composition. It creates at listener excitement and passion. Subgenres of Chahargah are: Bardasht, Maye, Bali-Kabutar, Djovhari, Basta-Nigar, Hisar, Mualif, Garra, Mukhalif, Ouj Mukhalif, Maghlub, Mansuriyya, Uzzal.

References 

Azerbaijani music
Modes (music)
Mugham modes
 Hormoz Farhat, The Dastgāh Concept in Persian Music (Cambridge University Press, 1990). ,  (first paperback edition, 2004).